Stairway to Heaven is a 2003 South Korean television series starring Choi Ji-woo, Kwon Sang-woo, Kim Tae-hee, and Shin Hyun-joon.  It aired on SBS from 3 December 2003 to 5 February 2004 on Wednesdays and Thursdays at 21:55 for 20 episodes.  The title of the show comes from the Led Zeppelin song of the same name, which is frequently used in the underscore.

The drama is the second entry in director Lee Jang-soo's Heaven Trilogy which included Beautiful Days in 2001 and Tree of Heaven in 2006. The drama was a hit and received an average viewership rating of 38.8%, and 45.3% for the finale.

Synopsis
Han Jung-suh (Choi Ji-woo) and Cha Song-joo (Kwon Sang-woo) are childhood friends and have a special bond that blossoms into love. They both share the pain of losing a loved one: Song-joo's father died in a traffic accident and Jung-suh's mother died of eye cancer. Jung-suh's father (Ha Jae-young) marries an actress named Tae Mi-ra (Lee Hui-hyang), who brings her real daughter, Han Yoo-ri (Kim Tae-hee), and son, Han Tae-hwa (Lee Wan) into the household. Yoo-ri is jealous of Jung-suh, making her look terrible in front of her mother, who begins to turn on Jung-suh. When Jung-suh's father leaves for work, her stepmother assaults her. She thwarts Jung-suh's attempts to study abroad with Song-joo, who then leaves for America alone. Mi-ra plots for Yoo-ri to win the affections of Song-joo who is the heir of his family fortune. All the while, Jung-suh tries to be nice to Tae-hwa, but he mistakes her friendship for something more, and falls in love with her.

Three years later, Song-joo (Kwon Sang-woo) comes back from America, and Jung-suh (Choi Ji-woo) rushes to greet him. A jealous Yoo-ri (Kim Tae-hee) tries to stop them from reuniting.  As they race to the airport, Yoo-ri intentionally hits Jung-suh with her car. Jung-suh is taken to the hospital where a group of people had just died in fire. Yoo-ri swaps Jung-suh's ID with one of the people to fake her death. She takes the real Jung-suh to her biological father's home. Tae-hwa (Shin Hyun-joon), still in love with Jung-suh, finds out what Yoo-ri has done, but seizes the opportunity to run away with Jung-suh. Jung-suh loses her memory, and Tae-hwa moves them away and changes their names.

Five years later, Yoo-ri is soon to be engaged to Song-joo. Song-joo decides that he needs to let go of Jung-suh and goes to the carousel they used to ride as children. He wishes to see Jung-suh just once more, looks up, and sees her on the carousel. Jung-suh, now named Kim Ji-soo, works at a small clothing shop while living with Tae-hwa (now Chul-soo). Song-joo rushes to Ji-soo and tells her that he is Jung-suh, but she doesn't believe him. Song-joo is determined to make her remember her past, and through a series of events, he and Jung-suh become close.

Jung-suh regains her memory when Yoo-ri nearly hits her with her car again and rushes to tell Song-joo. She forgives Tae-hwa as she knew he did it out of love. Jung-suh and Song-joo are happy together, until she discovers she has eye cancer. She asks Tae-hwa to take her away from Song-joo, since she can't bear to see him in pain. Gradually, Jung-suh's vision deteriorates into blindness. Tae-hwa tells Song-joo and his family the truth starting from the accident. Yoo-ri is arrested, and her mother goes insane and is admitted to a mental hospital.

Song-joo marries Jung-suh, who is now blind, with the blessing of his mother and her father. Jung-suh tells Tae-hwa that her one wish is to see Song-joo's face one last time. Both Song-joo and Tae-hwa ask a doctor to let them give Jung-suh one of their corneas, but the doctor tells them that they can't take corneas from live donors. Tae-hwa wants to grant her wish at all costs and commits suicide via car crash in order to donate his cornea to her. After his death, Jung-suh has the operation and is able to see again. However, Song-joo finds out about Tae-hwa's death and later on tells Jung-suh. She starts to feel sick again, and the doctor states that the tumor has spread to her brain and is inoperable; the same incurable illness that killed her mother. Jung-suh, realizing this, forgives Tae Mi-ra and Yoo-ri because of Tae-hwa. Both Yoo-ri and Tae Mi-ra feel remorse for their wrongdoings against Jung-suh, and apologize to her. Jung-suh dies a few days later at the seaside near her childhood home, in the arms of Song-joo. The ending scene reverts to the beginning scene where Song-joo is playing his piano by the ocean of the memorable beach house. He says, "Perhaps, that person (Tae-hwa) might have loved that girl (Jung-suh) more than I. But even though I say this, that doesn't mean that I loved her any less."

Cast

Main
 Kwon Sang-woo as Cha Song-joo
 Baek Sung-hyun as young Song-joo
 Choi Ji-woo as Han Jung-suh / Kim Ji-soo
 Park Shin-hye as young Jung-suh
 Shin Hyun-joon as Han Tae-hwa / Han Chul-soo
 Lee Wan as young Tae-hwa
 Kim Tae-hee as Han Yoo-ri
 Park Ji-mi as young Yoo-ri

Supporting
 Ha Jae-young as Han Su-ha (Jung-suh's father)
 Lee Hwi-hyang as Tae Mi-ra (Tae-hwa and Yoo-ri's mother)
 Jung Han-yong as Han Pil-su (Tae-hwa and Yoo-ri's father)
 Lee Charm (Bernhard Quandt) as Director Jang
 Kim Ji-sook as Min Seo-hyun (Song-joo's mother)
 Park Young-ji
 Jung Ha-na
 Lee Tae-sung

Production
Recreation complex Lotte World in Seoul was used as a filming location, namely the carousel, ice rink and as the seat of Cha Song-joo's family business.

Soundtrack
 Chopin's Piano Concerto No. 1 Op.11 E Minor 2nd Mvt : Romanza 
 Memories of Heaven – Jang Jung-woo
 Lethe – Kang Woo-jin
 Ave Maria – Rebecca Luker
 That's the Only One – Jang Jung-woo
 Forever 
 Only Me For You – Kim Hyun-ah
 Remember
 Sad Love 
 To the Beautiful You – Moon Ji-hwan
 I Will Protect You 
 I Miss You – Kim Bum-soo
 This is Not the End 
 Memories of Heaven – Park Mook-hwan
 Though I Am at the End of the World 
 Promise 
 That's the Only One – Park Mook-hwan
 Stairway to Heaven
 Bania u cygana – Zero

International broadcast
In 2004, the broadcast rights were sold to Japan for appropriately , at the time a record price for a Korean drama export. It aired as part of Fuji TV's "Saturday Hallyu Wide Hour" programming block. The first episode received a viewership rating of 6% to 8% and went on to receive ratings as high at 12%. It also aired on cable channel KNTV from 4 June to 29 October 2005. According to a poll conducted by TV Asahi variety show SMAP Station in May 2007, Stairway to Heaven ranked as the third most popular Korean drama in Japan.

It aired in Vietnam on HTV9 from May 2 to June 27, 2004.

It aired in the Philippines on GMA Network in 2005, during which it received a peak viewership rating of 41.5% and an average viewership rating of 36.1%, making it one of the highest rated programs of all time in the country. The series became a rerun after 10 years from 28 September to 27 November 2015 which transferred to morning from primetime on the same network. The series was rebroadcast on GMA News TV from November 23, 2020 to January 1, 2021 and was repaired on Heart of Asia, starting mid-week of September 2021.

In 2005, broadcasting rights to the drama were sold to eight countries across Latin America including Mexico, Peru and Costa Rica.

It aired in Thailand on Channel 3 in 2006.

It was aired in Indonesia on Indosiar in 2004 and became one of the most popular Korean drama at the time.

In North Korea
The show was popular among North Koreans. Allegedly, the show was seen by North Koreans via smuggling, as they wanted an alternative to watching North Korean state propaganda.

See also
Stairway to Heaven, a 2009 Philippine remake
Cinta Sejati, a 2011 Indonesian remake
Лестница в небеса, a 2016 Russian remake
ឋានសួគ៌ស្នេហ៍, a 2016 Cambodian remake

References

External links
  
 
 

Seoul Broadcasting System television dramas
Television series by Logos Film
2003 South Korean television series debuts
2004 South Korean television series endings
Korean-language television shows
South Korean romance television series
South Korean melodrama television series